Croatia competed at the 2022 European Athletics Championships in Munich, Germany, between 15 and 21 August 2022

Medallists

Results

Croatia entered the following athletes.

Men 
Field events

Women
 Track and road

Field events

References

External links
European Athletics Championships

2022
Nations at the 2022 European Athletics Championships
European Athletics